The Base  was a political party active in Sardinia, led by Efisio Arbau.

History
The party was founded in 2010 by Efisio Arbau, already mayor of Ollolai since 2005. Arbau, a member of the Democratic Party, asked for the primary election to run for the presidency of the Province of Nuoro. Anyway, the party denied the primaries to him, considering the re-nomination of Roberto Deriu, the outgoing president of the province, untouchable. Arbau, not wanting to give up his candidacy, was expelled from the PD along with seven other exponents of the territory. The regional section of the PD was also divided on the case: the parliamentarians Antonello Soro, Gian Piero Scanu, Guido Melis and Caterina Pes lined up with Arbau. Francesca Barracciu, then regional councilor, dubbed the expulsion of Arbau as a "squad and Holy Inquisition method". Arbau thus ran for president in the provincial election - then won again by Deriu - in alliance with Italy of Values, Greens, Red Moors and Left Ecology Freedom, arguing, during the entire electoral campaign, that the Democratic Party had now become a right-wing party. Arbau came in third, with 23.9% of the vote.

In 2013 Arbau took over the Regional Council from Francesca Barriacciu, who was elected to the European Parliament, and joined the Sardinia is already Tomorrow group. However, Arbau left the group shortly after, in dissent with the chairman Mario Diana on the request for a secret vote on the amendment to the double preference, thus causing its dissolution.

In the 2014 regional election, The Base took part in the centre-left coalition in support of Francesco Pigliaru's candidacy, which later turned out to be a winner. Despite the 0.7% of the vote obtained by the party, Arbau was re-elected to the Regional Council. However, in 2015, the Council of State declared Arbau lapsed from the charge along with three other regional councilors.

In 2018 Arbau announced the confluence of the Base in the Sardinian Action Party, in turn affiliated with the League, thus sanctioning a political shift to the right-wing. The alliance with the Sardinian Action Party and with the League caused the discontent of many members of The Base, such as the deputy mayor of Nuoro Sebastian Cocco, who decided to leave the party.

Electoral results

Sardinian regional elections

References

Political parties in Sardinia
Political parties established in 2010
2010 establishments in Italy
Political parties disestablished in 2018
2018 disestablishments in Italy